The 2nd Steppe Siberian Corps was an infantry corps of the White Guard's Siberian Army during the Russian Civil War. It was formed on 12 June 1918, by Polkovnik Pavel Ivanov-Rinov in Omsk. 

On 3 January 1919, a 3rd Steppe Siberian Army Corps under Grigory Verzhbitsky's command was formed by separating the 3rd and 4th Rifle Divisions from the 2nd Steppe Siberian Corps.

Commanders 
 Pavel Ivanov-Rinov (June 7 - September 5, 1918)
 Aleksei Matkovsky (September 6 - December 26, 1918)
 Vladimir Brzhezovsky (January - September 1919).

References

Sources
 Наступление армий Колчака весной 1919 года
 Знамёна Белых армий

Military units and formations of White Russia (Russian Civil War)